The women's 100 metres hurdles event at the 1999 All-Africa Games was held on 18 September 1999 at the Johannesburg Stadium.

Results

References

100